Anthony Chalençon (born 13 August 1990) is a French male visually impaired cross-country skier and biathlete who also formerly competed as an alpine skier. He switched from alpine skiing to take up Paralympic Nordic skiing after a disastrous start to his Paralympic career as an alpine skier in 2010. Anthony Chalençon clinched his first Paralympic medals after clinching a bronze medal in the 15km visually impaired biathlon event and gold  in the Open Relay during the 2018 Winter Paralympics.

Career 
Anthony Chalençon took up Para Nordic skiing in late 2011. With Benjamin Daviet and Thomas Clarion he won two world titles in the relay in 2015 and 2017.

He competed for France at the 2018 Winter Paralympics. He claimed his maiden Paralympic medal at the Pyeongchang Winter Paralympic Games, which was a bronze in the biathlon event.

He claimed his first Paralympic gold medal during the 2018 Winter Paralympics after winning the men's 4 x 2.5 km relay open team event for France along with other members including Benjamin Daviet and Thomas Clarion.

References

External links 
 
 

1990 births
Living people
French male alpine skiers
French male biathletes
French male cross-country skiers
Alpine skiers at the 2010 Winter Paralympics
Cross-country skiers at the 2018 Winter Paralympics
Biathletes at the 2018 Winter Paralympics
Paralympic alpine skiers of France
Paralympic biathletes of France
Paralympic cross-country skiers of France
Paralympic gold medalists for France
Paralympic bronze medalists for France
Medalists at the 2018 Winter Paralympics
Medalists at the 2022 Winter Paralympics
French blind people
Visually impaired category Paralympic competitors
People from Évian-les-Bains
Université Savoie-Mont Blanc alumni
Sportspeople from Haute-Savoie
Paralympic medalists in cross-country skiing
Paralympic medalists in biathlon
Cross-country skiers at the 2022 Winter Paralympics
20th-century French people
21st-century French people